Events from the year 1997 in the United States.

Incumbents

Federal government 

 President: Bill Clinton (D-Arkansas)
 Vice President: Al Gore (D-Tennessee)
 Chief Justice: William Rehnquist (Wisconsin)  
 Speaker of the House of Representatives: Newt Gingrich (R-Georgia)
 Senate Majority Leader: Trent Lott (R-Mississippi)
 Congress: 104th (until January 3), 105th (starting January 3)

Events

January

 January 17 – A Delta II rocket carrying a military GPS payload explodes shortly after liftoff from Cape Canaveral.
 January 20 – President Bill Clinton and Vice President Al Gore begin their second term. 
 January 26 – Super Bowl XXXI: The Green Bay Packers win the NFL Championship for the first time since 1967, defeating the New England Patriots 35–21 at the Louisiana Superdome in New Orleans, Louisiana.

February
 February 4 – State of the Union Address.
 February 5 – A Santa Monica jury finds former football legend O. J. Simpson liable for the deaths of Nicole Brown and Ron Goldman.
 February 8 – Motorcycle stunt rider Corey Scott is killed in front of a crowd of around 30,000 spectators at the Orange Bowl stadium in Miami, Florida, after a stunt goes terribly wrong.
 February 10 – The United States Army suspends Gene C. McKinney, Sergeant Major of the Army, its top-ranking enlisted soldier, after hearing allegations of sexual misconduct.
 February 13 
The Dow Jones Industrial Average closes above 7,000 for the first time, gaining 60.81 to 7,022.44.
STS-82:  Astronauts from Space Shuttle Discovery begin tune-up and repair work on the Hubble Space Telescope.
 February 23 – 1997 Empire State Building shooting: A gunman kills one person and wounds six others before taking his own life on the observation deck of the Empire State Building in Manhattan, New York City.
 February 28
FBI agent Earl Edwin Pitts pleads guilty to selling secrets to Soviet Union.
North Hollywood shootout: Two heavily armed bank robbers conflict with officers from the Los Angeles Police Department in a mass shootout.

March
 March 4 – U.S. President Bill Clinton bars federal funding for any research on human cloning.
 March 9 – 24-year-old Brooklyn rapper The Notorious B.I.G. is killed in a drive-by shooting shortly after leaving a Vibe magazine party at the Petersen Automotive Museum in Los Angeles before the release of his second album Life After Death. The album is released on March 25.
 March 13 – The Phoenix Lights are seen over Phoenix, Arizona.
 March 14 – A famous study of gender reassignment of a twin boy who lost his penis to a botched circumcision is refuted. The supposedly successful outcome for "Joan" had been widely cited as proof that gender was determined by nurture, yet the patient, David Reimer, was deeply unhappy and had returned to his original gender by the age of 15, thus indicating the exact opposite thesis.
 March 24 – The 69th Academy Awards, hosted by Billy Crystal, are held at Shrine Auditorium in Los Angeles, with Anthony Minghella's The English Patient winning nine awards out of 12 nominations, including Best Picture and Best Director. The telecast garners nearly 40.1 million viewers.
 March 26 – In San Diego, California, 39 Heaven's Gate cultists commit mass suicide at their compound.

April
 April 16 – Houston socialite Doris Angleton is murdered, drawing suspicion to her estranged husband, Robert. His brother Roger confesses to the crime and the investigation reveals that Robert had amassed a fortune through illegal betting.
 April 18 – The Red River of the North breaks through dikes and floods Grand Forks, North Dakota and East Grand Forks, Minnesota, causing US$2 billion in damage.

May

 May – For the first time since December 1973, unemployment falls below 5%. It would remain below 5% until September 2001, during the early 2000s recession.
 May 2 – The Franklin Delano Roosevelt Memorial is dedicated in Washington, D.C.
May 15 – The United States government acknowledges existence of the "Secret War" in Laos, and dedicates the Laos Memorial in honor of Hmong and other "Secret War" veterans.
May 16 – U.S. President Bill Clinton issues a formal apology to the surviving victims of the Tuskegee Study of Untreated Syphilis in the Negro Male and their families.
May 22 – Kelly Flinn, the U.S. Air Force's first female bomber pilot certified for combat, accepts a general discharge in order to avoid a court martial.
May 25 – Strom Thurmond becomes the longest-serving member in the history of the United States Senate (41 years and 10 months).
May 27 – The second-deadliest tornado of the 1990s hits in Jarrell, Texas, killing 27 people.

June
June 2 – In Denver, Colorado, Timothy McVeigh is convicted on 15 counts of murder and conspiracy for his role in the 1995 Oklahoma City bombing.
June 6 – In Lacey Township, New Jersey, high school senior Melissa Drexler gives birth in a toilet and leaves the newborn for dead in the trash.
June 7 
A computer user known as "_eci" publishes his C source code on a Windows 95 and Windows NT exploit, which later becomes WinNuke. The source code gets wide distribution across the internet, and Microsoft is forced to release a security patch.
The Detroit Red Wings win their first Stanley Cup championship in 42 years, defeating the Philadelphia Flyers 4 games to 0. Red Wings goaltender Mike Vernon is awarded the Conn Smythe Trophy as playoff MVP.
June 8 – A United States Coast Guard helicopter crashes near Humboldt Bay, California; all four crew members perish.
June 12 – The United States Department of the Treasury unveils a new $50 bill, meant to be more difficult to counterfeit.
June 13 – A jury sentences Timothy McVeigh to death for his part in the 1995 Oklahoma City bombing.
June 19 – The fast food chain McDonald's wins a partial victory in its libel trial, known as the "McLibel case", against two environmental campaigners. The judge agrees that McDonald's targeted its advertising at children, who pestered their parents into visiting the company's restaurants.
June 25 – The NHL announces the addition of four new franchises to be added to the league by the 2000-01 NHL season.
June 27 – Walt Disney Pictures' 35th feature film, Hercules, loosely based on the legendary mythological hero of the same name, is released to positive reviews but underperforms at the box office in comparison to its most recent predecessors.
June 28 – During the Evander Holyfield vs. Mike Tyson II boxing match in Las Vegas, Mike Tyson bites off part of Evander Holyfield's ear.

July

July 2 – Men in Black is released in theaters.
July 4 – NASA's Pathfinder space probe lands on the surface of Mars.
July 15 – Spree killer Andrew Cunanan shoots fashion designer Gianni Versace to death outside Versace's Miami Beach, Florida, residence.
 July 16 – The Dow Jones Industrial Average gains 63.17 to close at 8,038.88. It is the Dow's first close above 8,000. The Dow has doubled its value in 30 months.
 July 18 – The first Speedway gas station opens in Ohio.
 July 21 – The fully restored  (aka "Old Ironsides") celebrates her 200th birthday by setting sail for the first time in 116 years.
 July 23 – Digital Equipment Corporation files antitrust charges against chipmaker Intel.

August

 August 1 – Steve Jobs returns to Apple Computer, Inc at Macworld in Boston.
 August 6 – Microsoft buys a $150 million share of financially troubled Apple Computer.
 August 6 – Korean Air Flight 801 crashes while attempting to land in the U.S. territory of Guam, killing 229.

September
 September 4 – In Lorain, Ohio, the last Ford Thunderbird for three years rolls off the assembly line.
 September 15 – www.google.com is registered by Google.
 September 29 – The Forced Abortion Condemnation Act is introduced in the U.S. Congress.
 September 30 – Facing increasing shifts to the use of GPS, the Omega radio navigation system is deactivated.

October
 October 1 – Luke Woodham walks into Pearl High School in Pearl, Mississippi and opens fire, killing two girls, after killing his mother earlier that morning.
 October 4 
One million men gather for Promise Keepers' "Stand in the Gap" event in Washington, DC.
Loomis Fargo Bank Robbery: The second largest cash robbery in U.S. history ($17.3 million, mostly in small bills) occurs at the Charlotte, North Carolina, office of Wells Fargo. An FBI investigation eventually results in 24 convictions and the recovery of approximately 95% of the stolen cash.
 October 15 
Andy Green sets the first supersonic land speed record for the ThrustSSC team, led by Richard Noble of the UK.
NASA launches the Cassini-Huygens probe to Saturn.
 October 16 – The first color photograph appears on the front page of The New York Times.
 October 26 – 1997 World Series: The Florida Marlins defeat the Cleveland Indians.
 October 27 – Stock markets around the world crash due to a global economic crisis scare. The Dow Jones Industrial Average follows suit and plummets 554.26, or 7.18%, to 7,161.15. The points loss exceeds the loss from Black Monday. Officials at the New York Stock Exchange for the first time invoke the "circuit breaker" rule to stop trading.
 October 28 – In the U.S., the Dow Jones Industrial Average gains a record 337.17 points, closing at 7,498.32. One billion shares are traded on the New York Stock Exchange for the first time ever.
 October 30 – In Newton, Massachusetts, British au pair Louise Woodward is found guilty of the baby-shaking death of 8-month-old Matthew Eappen.

November

 November – The unemployment rate drops to 4.6%, the lowest since October 1973.
 November 10 
Telecom companies WorldCom and MCI Communications announce a US$37 billion merger to form MCI WorldCom (the largest merger in U.S. history).
A Fairfax, Virginia, jury finds Mir Qazi guilty of murdering two CIA employees in 1993.
 November 12 – Ramzi Yousef is found guilty of masterminding the 1993 World Trade Center bombing.
 November 14 – Mary Kay Letourneau is sentenced to six months imprisonment in Washington after pleading guilty to two counts of second-degree child rape. Letourneau gave birth to her victims' child and the leniency of her sentence was widely criticized.
 November 19 – In Des Moines, Iowa, Bobbi McCaughey gives birth to septuplets in the second known case where all seven babies are born alive, and the first in which all survive infancy.
 November 27 – NASA's Tropical Rainfall Measuring Mission is launched, the start of the satellite component of the Clouds and the Earth's Radiant Energy System.

December
 December 1 – Michael Carneal opens fire on a prayer group at Heath High School in West Paducah, Kentucky, killing three and injuring five.
 December 3 – In Ottawa, Ontario, Canada, representatives from 121 countries sign a treaty prohibiting the manufacture and deployment of anti-personnel land mines. However, the United States, the People's Republic of China, and Russia do not sign the treaty.
 December 18-Comedian and Saturday Night Live Actor Chris Farley is found dead from a drug overdose in his apartment on the 60th floor at John Hannock Center in Chicago Illinois.
 December 19 – James Cameron's Titanic, the highest-grossing film of all time until Avatar (2009), premieres in the U.S.

Ongoing
 Iraqi no-fly zones (1991–2003)
 Dot-com bubble (c. 1995–c. 2000)

Births

January

 January 4 – CJ, rapper
 January 8 – Jack Andraka, inventor
 January 13
 Lori Harvey, model and entrepreneur
 Jimmy Wopo, rapper (d. 2018)
 January 14 – Joey Luthman, actor
 January 17
 Lamar Jackson, American football player
 Shea Patterson, American football player
 Jake Paul, American actor
 Kyle Tucker, American baseball outfielder
 January 20 – Blueface, rapper 
 January 21 – Jeremy Shada, actor and singer
 January 23 
 Lexie Priessman, gymnast
 January 24
 Jonah Bobo, actor
 Dylan Riley Snyder, actor, singer, dancer
 January 25 – Noah Hanifin, ice hockey player 
 January 26 – Gedion Zelalem, footballer
 January 27 – Peyton Ernst, artistic gymnast
 January 29 – Jack Roslovic, ice hockey player

February

 February 6 – Mitch Hyatt, American football player
 February 7
Saquon Barkley, American football player
Matthew Gumley, actor
 February 8 – Kathryn Newton, actress
 February 9
 Jaire Alexander, American football player
 Bella Poarch, tiktoker
 February 10 
 Josh Jackson, basketball player
 Lilly King, swimmer
 Chloë Grace Moretz, actress 
 Josh Rosen, American football player 
 February 11
 Damien Harris, American football player 
 Mike Hughes, American football player  
 February 12 – Shane Baumel, actor
 February 13 – Deondre Francois, American football player  
 February 14 – Madison Iseman, actress
 February 15
 Myles Gaskin, American football player  
 Derrick Jones Jr., American basketball player  
 February 20 – Mitchie Brusco, skateboarder
 February 21 – Ben Rhodes, stock car racing driver
 February 25 
 Brock Boeser, ice hockey player 
 Isabelle Fuhrman, actress
 February 26 – Aidan Gould, actor

March

 March 2
 Becky G, American singer
 Lizzy LeDuc, American-born Filipino artistic gymnast
 March 3
Camila Cabello, Cuban American singer
Ty Walker, American snowboarder
 March 9 – Jessica Rogers, wheelchair athlete
 March 10 – Uriah Shelton, actor and singer
 March 14 – Simone Biles, artistic gymnast
 March 16 – Tyrel Jackson Williams, actor
 March 17 – Katie Ledecky, swimmer
 March 18 – Ciara Bravo, actress and singer
 March 20 – Wifisfuneral, rapper
 March 26 – Cameron Smith, football player
 March 29 – Josh Sweat, football player
 March 30 – Gideon Adlon, actress

April

 April 8 – Roquan Smith, American football player
 April 10 – Claire Wineland, activist and author (died 2018)
 April 12
 Jacob Clemente, actor and dancer
 Katelyn Ohashi, artistic gymnast
 April 15 – Donavan Brazier, middle-distance runner
 April 18 – Caleb Swanigan, basketball player (died 2022)
 April 23 – Andrew Callaghan, journalist
 April 26 – Amber Midthunder, actress

May 

 May 1 – Ariel Gade, actress
 May 2 – Perla Haney-Jardine, Brazilian-born actress
 May 3
 Desiigner, rapper
 Dwayne Haskins, American football quarterback (died 2022)
 May 9 – Zane Huett, actor
 May 11 – Coi Leray, musician
 May 12 – Odeya Rush, Israeli-born actress
 May 14 – Riley Griffiths, actor
 May 15
 Precious Doe, murder victim (died 2001)
 Smokepurpp, rapper
 May 21 – Kevin Quinn, actor and singer
 May 23 – Coy Craft, American footballer
 May 27 – Daniel Jones, American footballer
 May 30 
 Peter Lenz, amateur motorcycle racer (died 2010)
 Jake Short, actor

June

 June 11
 John Hunter Nemechek, stock car racing driver
 Kodak Black, rapper
 June 15 – Madison Kocian, artistic gymnast
 June 20 – Maria Lark, Russian-born actress
 June 21 – Rebecca Black, singer

July
 July 13 – Leo Howard, actor
 July 20 – Billi Bruno, actress
 July 22 – Field Cate, actor
 July 23 – Faresa Kapisi, track and field athlete

August

 August 2 – Christina Robinson, actress
 August 5  
 Adam Irigoyen, actor
 Olivia Holt, actress
 August 8 – Corpse Husband, internet personality
 August 10 – Kylie Jenner, model
 August 12 – Jordan Brown 
 August 16 – Greyson Chance, singer
 August 19 – Joseph Castanon, actor and singer
 August 23 – Lil Yachty, rapper
 August 25 – Madison Desch, artistic gymnast
 August 26 – Cordae, rapper

September

 September 3 – Shavar McIntosh, actor
 September 10 – Leah Keiser, figure skater
 September 11 – Julia Marino, snowboarder
 September 16 – Elena Kampouris, actress
 September 24 – Malaya Watson, singer
 September 27 – Jaiden Animations, animator

October

 October 2 – Rubi Rose, rapper and model
 October 3 – Colby Stevenson, freestyle skier
 October 4 – Brenden Foster, cancer patient (died 2008)
 October 6 – Michael J. Woodard, singer, voice actor
 October 7 – Kira Kosarin, actress
 October 8 – Bella Thorne, actress, dancer, singer, and model
 October 10
 DDG, rapper
 Grace Rolek, actress and singer
 October 13
 Aaron Refvem, actor
 October 15 – Adora Svitak, prodigy and author
 October 23
 Nick Bosa, American football player
 Zach Callison, actor
 October 24 – Arthur Gunn, singer
 October 25 – Tyler Alvarez, actor
 October 27 – Lonzo Ball, basketball player
 October 28
Joy-Anna Forsyth, television personality
Taylor Fritz, tennis player
Sierra McCormick, actress
 October 31 – Sydney Park, actress

November

 November 1
 Max Burkholder, actor
 Alex Wolff, actor and musician
 November 6 – Riley Pint, baseball pitcher
 November 9 – Alex Kirilloff, baseball outfielder
 November 12 – Dexter Lawrence, American football player
 November 13 – Brent and Shane Kinsman, twin actors
 November 17 – Zach Bonner, philanthropist and founder of the non-profit charity Little Red Wagon Foundation
 November 19 
 Zach Collins, basketball player
 The McCaughey septuplets
 Rachel Parsons, ice dancer
November 20 – Michael Reeves, online personality
 November 26 – Aubrey Joseph, actor
 November 29 – William Byron, racing driver

December

 December 3 – Rashan Gary, American football player
 December 5 – Maddie Poppe, singer 
 December 11
 Alexis Beucler, artistic gymnast
 Ben Cook, actor
 December 12 
 Christian Saulsberry, American football player (died 2022)
 Jacob Wohl, far-right conspiracy theorist, fraudster, and internet troll
 December 14 – DK Metcalf, American football wide receiver
 December 15
 Stefania LaVie Owen, actress
 Maude Apatow, actress
 December 20 – De'Aaron Fox, basketball player
 December 28 – Nash Grier, Internet personality
 December 31 – Cameron Carter-Vickers, soccer player

Full date unknown
 Milivi Adams (died 2002)
 Amanda Balon, actress, vocalist and dancer
 Lexi Peters, first female ice hockey player to appear in an EA Sports NHL Hockey video game

Deaths

January

 January 1 – Townes Van Zandt, American Country-folk music singer-songwriter (b. 1944)
 January 4 – Harry Helmsley, American real estate mogul (b. 1909)
 January 5 – Burton Lane, American composer and lyricist (b. 1912)
 January 6 – Catherine Scorsese, Italian-American actress (b. 1912)
 January 8 – Melvin Calvin, American chemist (b. 1911)
 January 9
 Jesse White, American actor (b. 1917)
 Ellen Griffin Dunne, American actress and activist (b. 1932)
 January 10 – Sheldon Leonard, American actor, director, and producer (b. 1907)
 January 11 – Carol Habben, American baseball player (b. 1933)
 January 12 – Charles Brenton Huggins, Canadian-born cancer researcher (b. 1901)
 January 17 – Clyde Tombaugh, American astronomer (b. 1906)
 January 18 – Paul Tsongas, American politician (b. 1941)
 January 19 
 James Dickey, American poet and novelist (b. 1923)
 Adriana Caselotti, American actress (b. 1916)
 January 20 – Curt Flood, American baseball player and sportscaster (b. 1938)
 January 23 – Richard Berry, American singer and composer (b. 1935)
 January 24 – Dr. Jerry Graham, American wrestler and trainer (b. 1921)
 January 25 – Jeane Dixon, American astrologer (b. 1904)
 January 26 – Laurence Stoddard, American rower (b. 1903)
 January 30 – Charles Hargens, American painter. (b. 1893)
 January 31 – Johnny Klein, American drummer (b. 1918)

February

 February 1
 Herb Caen, American newspaper columnist (b. 1916)
 Marjorie Reynolds, American actress (b. 1917)
 February 5 – Pamela Harriman, American diplomat (b. 1920)
 February 7 – Owen Aspinall, 45th Governor of American Samoa (b. 1927)
 February 8 – Corey Scott, American motorcycle stunt rider (b. 1968)
 February 11 – Don Porter, American actor (b. 1912)
 February 13 – John R. Bartels, American judge (b. 1897)
 February 16 – Ethel Owen, American actress (b. 1893)
 February 23 – Tony Williams, American musician (b. 1945)
 February 24 – Isabelle Lucas, Canadian-born British actress (b. 1927)
 February 26 – David Doyle, American actor (b. 1929)

March
 March 2 – Judi Bari, American environmental activist (b. 1949)
 March 4
 Robert H. Dicke, American experimental physicist (b. 1916)
 Carey Loftin, American actor and stuntman (b. 1914)
 March 7 – Edward Mills Purcell, American physicist (b. 1912)
 March 9 – The Notorious B.I.G., American rapper (b. 1972)
 March 10 – LaVern Baker, American singer (b. 1929)
 March 15 – Gail Davis, American actress (b. 1925)
 March 17 – Jermaine Stewart, American singer (b. 1957)
 March 20 – Tony Zale, American boxer (b. 1913)
 March 21 – John Nemechek, American race car driver (b. 1970)

April

 April 5 – Allen Ginsberg, American poet (b. 1926)
 April 8 – Laura Nyro, American singer and composer (b. 1947)
 April 10 – Michael Dorris, American author (b. 1945)
 April 12 – George Wald, American scientist (b. 1906)
 April 13 – Dorothy Frooks, American author, military figure and actress. (b. 1896)
 April 15
 Don Bexley, American actor and comedian (b. 1910)
 Mildred Cleghorn, Chairwoman of the Fort Sill Apache tribe (b. 1910)
 April 16 – Doris Angleton, American socialite (b. 1951)
 April 20
 Jean Louis, American costume designer (b. 1907)
 Henry Mucci, American army ranger (b. 1909)
 April 21 – Thomas H. D. Mahoney, American professor and politician (b. 1913)
 April 24 – Pat Paulsen, American comedian (b. 1927)
 April 26 – John Beal, American actor (b. 1909)
 April 30 – Henry Picard, American golfer (b. 1906)

May
 May 4
 Alvy Moore, American actor (b. 1921)
 Lee Miglin, American businessman and philanthropist (b. 1924)
 May 11 – Howard Morton, American actor (b. 1925)
 May 14
 Harry Blackstone Jr., American magician (b. 1934)
 Thelma Carpenter, American singer and actress (b. 1922)
 May 18 – Bridgette Andersen, American actress (b. 1975)
 May 22 – Alfred Hershey, American biochemist (b. 1908)
 May 23 – James Lee Byars, American artist (b. 1932)
 May 29 – Jeff Buckley, American musician (b. 1966)
 May 31 – James Bennett Griffin, American archaeologist (b. 1905)

June

 June 2 – Helen Jacobs, American tennis champion (b. 1908)
 June 3 – Dennis James, American game show host (b. 1917)
 June 6 – Magda Gabor, American actress (b. 1915)
 June 8 – Reid Shelton, American actor (b. 1924)
 June 14 – Richard Jaeckel, American actor (b. 1926)
 June 23 
 Betty Shabazz, American educator and activist (b. 1936)
 William Slater Brown, American novelist, biographer and translator (b. 1896)
 June 24
 Don Hutson, American football player (b. 1913)
 Brian Keith, American actor (b. 1921)
 June 26 – Israel Kamakawiwoole, Hawaiian singer (b. 1959)
 June 29 – William Hickey, American actor (b. 1927)

July

 
 July 1
 Robert Mitchum, American actor (b. 1917)
 Charles Werner, American cartoonist (b. 1909)
 July 2 – James Stewart, American actor and soldier (b. 1908)
 July 4 – Charles Kuralt, American reporter and television journalist (b. 1934)
 July 5 – Mrs. Miller, American singer (b. 1907)
 July 13 – Alexandra Danilova, Russian-American ballerina and dance instructor (b. 1903)
 July 15 – Gianni Versace, Italian fashion designer (b. 1946)
 July 18 – Eugene Merle Shoemaker, American astronomer (b. 1928)
 July 23 – Andrew Cunanan, American serial killer (b. 1969)
 July 24
 William J. Brennan Jr., American Supreme Court Justice (b. 1906)
 Frank Parker, American tennis champion (b. 1916)
 July 25 – Ben Hogan, American golf champion (b. 1912)
 July 27 – K'tut Tantri, American broadcaster and hotelier, (b. 1899)

August

 August 2 – William S. Burroughs, American writer and artist (b. 1914)
 August 10 – Conlon Nancarrow, American-born composer (b. 1912)
 August 12 – Luther Allison, American musician (b. 1939)
 August 18
 Harry R. Wellman, American university president (b. 1899)
 Jimmy Witherspoon, American musician (b. 1920)
 August 25 – Carl Richard Jacobi, American journalist and author (b. 1908)
 August 27
 Sally Blane, American actress (b. 1910)
 Brandon Tartikoff, American television executive (b. 1949)

September

 September 2 – Rudolf Bing, Austrian-born British opera manager (b. 1902)
 September 7 – Elisabeth Brooks, Canadian actress (b. 1951)
 September 8 – Helen Shaw, American actress (b. 1897)
 September 9
 Richie Ashburn, American baseball player and broadcaster (b. 1927)
 Burgess Meredith, American actor (b. 1907)
 September 13 – Victor Szebehely, Hungarian-American astronomer (b. 1921)
 September 17 – Red Skelton, American comedian (b. 1913)
 September 18 – Jimmy Witherspoon, American blues singer (b. 1920)
 September 19 – Rich Mullins, American Christian musician (b. 1955)
 September 23
 Shirley Clarke, American filmmaker (b. 1919)
 Wilbur R. Ingalls, Jr., American architect (b. 1923)
 September 26 – Dorothy Kingsley, American screenwriter and producer (b. 1909)
 September 27 – Adriana Marines, American murder victim (b. 1991)
 September 29 – Roy Lichtenstein, American artist (b. 1923)

October

 October 1 – Jerome H. Lemelson, American inventor (b. 1923)
 October 5
 Brian Pillman, American professional wrestler (b. 1962)
 Arthur Tracy, American singer (b. 1899)
 October 6 – Johnny Vander Meer, American baseball player (b. 1914)
 October 9 – Arch Johnson, American actor (b. 1922)
 October 12 – John Denver, American musician (b. 1943)
 October 14 – Harold Robbins, American writer (b. 1916)
 October 16
 Audra Lindley, American actress (b. 1918)
 James A. Michener, American writer (b. 1907)
 October 19 – Glen Buxton, American guitarist (b. 1947)
 October 21 – Dolph Camilli, American baseball player (b. 1907)
 October 23 – Claire Falkenstein, American sculptor, painter, printmaker, jewelry designer and teacher (b. 1908)
 October 24 – Don Messick, American voice actor (b. 1926)
 October 28 – Paul Jarrico, American screenwriter (b. 1915)
 October 29
 Andreas Gerasimos Michalitsianos, American astrophysicist (b. 1947)
 Anton Szandor LaVey, American author and Satanist (b. 1930)
 October 30 – Samuel Fuller, American screenwriter and director (b. 1912)

November

 November 1 – Victor Mills, American chemical engineer (b. 1897)
 November 11 – Rod Milburn, American athlete (b. 1950)
 November 13 – Dawud M. Mu'Min, murderer (b. 1953)
 November 22 – Joanna Moore, American actress (b. 1934)
 November 23 – Hulda Crooks, American mountaineer (b. 1896)
 November 30 – Kathy Acker, American author (b. 1947)

December

 December 2 – Michael Hedges, American composer and guitarist (b. 1953)
 December 14 – Stubby Kaye, American actor (b. 1918)
 December 16 
 Lillian Disney, American artist (b. 1899)
 Nicolette Larson, American pop singer (b. 1952)
 Thomas J. Parmley, American academic (b. 1897)
 December 18 – Chris Farley, American actor and comedian (b. 1964)
 December 19
 David Schramm, American astrophysicist (b. 1945)
 Jimmy Rogers, American musician (b. 1924)
 December 20 – Denise Levertov, English-born American poet (b. 1923)
 December 21 – Amie Comeaux, American country singer (b. 1976)
 December 23 – Stanley Cortez, American cinematographer (b. 1908)
 December 25 – Denver Pyle, American actor (b. 1920)
 December 31
 Billie Dove, American actress (b. 1903)
 Michael LeMoyne Kennedy, American socialite (b. 1958)

See also 
 1997 in American soccer
 1997 in American television
 List of American films of 1997
 Timeline of United States history (1990–2009)

References

External links
 

 
1990s in the United States
United States
United States
Years of the 20th century in the United States